Linda Marie Abriola is an American environmental and civil engineer who specializes in the study of organic chemical liquid contaminants in porous media. She is currently the Joan Wernig and E. Paul Sorensen Professor of Engineering at the Brown University School of Engineering.

Academic history and positions
Abriola attended  Drexel University, graduating with a B.S. in civil engineering in 1976. She continued her education at Princeton University, where she earned her Ph.D. in civil engineering in 1983.

From 1984 to 2003 she served on the faculty of the Department of Civil and Environmental Engineering at the University of Michigan. There she directed the Environmental and Water Resources Engineering Program from 1996 to 2001.

In 2003 she left the University of Michigan to become Dean of the School of Engineering at Tufts University, and holds a position as Professor of Civil and Environmental Engineering, and Adjunct Professor in Chemical and Biological Engineering. She also directs the Integrated Multiphase Environmental Systems Laboratory at Tufts.

She was named University Professor at Tufts in 2015, a prestigious title awarded in recognition of the contributions she has made to her field as well as her commitment to the University's community.

In 2016, she was selected as a U.S. Science Envoy by the United States State Department.

Research
Abriola's research has focused on describing the behavior of organic chemical liquid contaminants in porous media, through the combination of laboratory experimentation and mathematical models. She was one of the first to create a mathematical model of the interphase mass partitioning and non-aqueous phase migration of organic liquid contaminants in the subsurface flow. She is particularly known for the research she has done on the characterization and remediation of chlorinated solvent-contaminated aquifers.

Recently, she has used a combination of models and lab experimentation to examine the influence of abiotic and biotic processes on the persistence of organics and on the effectiveness of aquifer remediation technologies.

Abriola is the author of more than 120 refereed publications, and is an ISI Highly Cited Researcher in Ecology/Environment.

Selected honors and awards

2013 Engineering Leader of the Year Award, Drexel University
2012 Strategic Environmental Research and Development Program (SERDP) Environmental Restoration Project of the Year Award
2011 The Power List, CE News
2011 Annual Distinguished Ryckman Lecture, McKelvey School of Engineering at Washington University in St. Louis 2010 Listed in encyclopedia American Women of Science since 1900
2010 Charles & Mary O'Melia Lecture in Environmental Sciences, Johns Hopkins University
2008 CESEP Distinguished Lecture, Colorado School of Mines
2006 SERDP Environmental Restoration Project of the Year Award
2006 Elected to the American Academy of Arts and Sciences
2006 Lichtenstein Distinguished Lecture, Ohio State University College of Engineering
2004 Distinguished Lecturer for Georgia Institute of Technology Lecture Series
2003 Elected to the National Academy of Engineering
2002 ISI Highly Cited Research in Ecology/Environment
2001-03 Horace Williams King Collegiate Professorship (University of Michigan College of Engineering)
2000 Elected Fellow of the American Geophysical Union
1998 College of Engineering Teaching Excellence Award, The University of Michigan
1996 Outstanding Educator Award, Association for Women Geoscientists
1996 Distinguished Darcy Lecturer, National Ground Water Association
1994 College of Engineering Research Excellence Award, The University of Michigan
1991 Republic Bank Corp. Centennial Professorship in Petroleum Engineering (The University of Texas at Austin)
1988 Recipient, Class of 1938E Distinguished Service Award to Outstanding Members of the Engineering Faculty, The University of Michigan
1985 Recipient, National Science Foundation Presidential Young Investigator Award

Family
Abriola is the daughter of Joseph and Gloria Christian Abriola. She is married to Lawrence Albert, and has three children.

References

External links

American civil engineers
Environmental engineers
1954 births
Living people
Fellows of the American Geophysical Union
University of Michigan faculty
Drexel University alumni
Princeton University School of Engineering and Applied Science alumni
Tufts University faculty
Scientists from Massachusetts
Scientists from Michigan
Scientists from Pennsylvania
20th-century American chemists
21st-century American chemists
20th-century American engineers
21st-century American engineers
20th-century American women scientists
21st-century American women scientists
American women academics
Brown University faculty